Olav Aslakson Versto (22 June 1892 – 13 June 1977) was a Norwegian politician for the Labour Party.

He was born in Rauland.

He was elected to the Norwegian Parliament from Telemark in 1928, and was re-elected on eight occasions.

Versto was a member of the executive committee of Vinje municipality from 1919 to 1931 and 1947 to 1955. Between 1931 and 1937 he served as deputy mayor. He was also a member of Telemark county council in 1945.

References

1892 births
1963 deaths
Labour Party (Norway) politicians
Members of the Storting
20th-century Norwegian politicians